The SCW World Heavyweight Championship briefly served as the top singles title in Southwest Championship Wrestling for a few months in 1983. The title was established in response to SCW landing a television show on the USA Network in late-1982, but after USA controversially canceled Southwest Championship Wrestling a few months later and turned its TV time over to WWF All American Wrestling, the title was forgotten and eventually abandoned.

Title history

External links
SWCW World Heavyweight title history

World Heavyweight Championship
Recurring sporting events established in 1983
Recurring events disestablished in 1983